Baimao Hou is a green tea made from the leaves and bud of the green tea leaf when harvested during the first two weeks of the season (late March to early April). It originates from the Taimu Mountains in Fujian Province, China. The delicate leaves are carefully steamed and dried. The name originates from the appearance of the dried leaves, which are said to resemble the paw of a white-haired monkey. Due to the tea's appearance, flavor, and name, it is often mistaken for a white tea.

References

Green tea
Chinese teas
Wuyi tea